Calgary Co-operative Association Limited (commonly referred to as Calgary Co-op) is a retail cooperative operating in Calgary, Alberta, Canada.

History
Opened in the 1940s as a food store operated by the United Farmers of Alberta in Calgary and eventually changing hands to the Alberta Co-operative Wholesale Association (ACWA) in 1951, the Calgary Co-operative Association was founded to operate the Calgary food store independently of the ACWA, partially due to member dissatisfaction with how the ACWA managed the venture.  The Calgary Co-operative Association purchased the Calgary store from ACWA in 1956 for $58,000.

Present operations
As a member of Federated Co-operatives (FCL), Calgary Co-op has over 440,000 members, 3400 employees, assets of $441 million and annual sales over $1 billion. Calgary Co-op provides services in food, petroleum, home health care, pharmacy and cannabis. 

In August 2019, it was announced that Calgary Co-op had entered into an agreement for its groceries to be supplied by the Alberta arm of the Overwaitea Food Group (owner of commercial competitor Save-On-Foods) beginning in April 2020. The organisation stated that this change would "better serve members and ensure long-term sustainability". Calgary Co-op's High River grocery store will not be part of this change and will continue to be supplied by FCL, as will its petroleum and convenience store operations. FCL criticized Calgary Co-op's decision to switch to a private company as supplier, with its CEO Scott Banda stating that it was "sad to see them moving away from the Co-op family they've helped build". 

With the change, the chain migrated to two private label brands, "Founders & Farmers" —which is positioned as a value-oriented brand, and "Cal & Gary's"—which is positioned as a premium brand with nods to local culture and humour. Both brands emphasize the involvement of local producers where applicable.

See also
List of Co-operative Federations
Supermarkets in Canada

References

External links

Companies based in Calgary
Consumers' co-operatives of Canada
Food and drink companies based in Alberta